System76, Inc. is an American computer manufacturer based in Denver, Colorado, specializing in the sale of notebooks, desktops, and servers. The company utilizes free and open-source software, and offers a choice of Ubuntu or their own Ubuntu-based Linux distribution Pop!_OS as preinstalled operating systems.

History
System76 was founded by Carl Richell and Erik Fetzer. In 2003, Fetzer registered the domain system76.com to sell computers with  Linux operating systems preinstalled, but the idea was not pursued until two years later. The number 76 in the company name is a reference to 1776, the year the American Revolution took place. Richell explained that the company hoped to spark an "open source revolution", giving consumers a choice to not use proprietary software.

In mid-2005, the founders considered which Linux distribution to offer, with Red Hat Enterprise Linux, openSUSE, Yoper and other distributions evaluated. Ubuntu was initially dismissed, but Richell and Fetzer changed their mind quickly after a re-evaluation. Richell liked Canonical’s business model of completely free software, backed by commercial support when needed. The first computers sold by System76 shipped with Ubuntu 5.10 Breezy Badger preinstalled.

In response to Canonical switching to the GNOME desktop from the Unity interface for future releases of Ubuntu in May 2017, System76 announced a new shell called Pop. The company announced in June 2017 that it would be creating its own Linux distribution based on Ubuntu called Pop!_OS.

Products
System76's computer models are named after various African animals.

System76's firmware partly disables the Intel Management Engine; the Intel Management Engine is proprietary firmware which runs an operating system in post-2008 Intel chipsets.

Pop!_OS

Pop!_OS is a Linux distribution developed by System76, based on Ubuntu. and using the GNOME Desktop Environment. It is intended for use by "developers, makers, and computer science professionals". Pop!_OS provides full disk encryption by default as well as streamlined window management, workspaces, and keyboard shortcuts for navigation.

Community relations
The company has sponsored the Ubuntu Developer Summit, Southern California Linux Expo, and other Open Source/Linux events and conferences. Their official support forums are hosted by Canonical Ltd., the primary developer of Ubuntu.

System76 is an active member in the Colorado Ubuntu Community, serving as the corporate sponsor for Ubuntu LoCo events and release parties in downtown Denver.

See also

 Framework Computer
 Linux adoption
 Purism (company)
 Pine64

References

External links

 

Companies based in Denver
Computer companies of the United States
Computer hardware companies
Consumer electronics brands
Online retailers of the United States
Ubuntu